Sisters of Charity Hospital can refer to:
Sisters of Charity Hospital (Zagreb) in Croatia
Sisters of Charity Hospital (Buffalo) in the United States